The Naval Service Reserve (NSR) is the reserve force of the Irish Naval Service. It is one of two elements of the Reserve Defence Forces (RDF) of the Irish Defence Forces, the other element being the Army Reserve (AR). The NSR was established on 1 October 2005 to replace and reorganise the previous naval reserve organisation, An Slua Muirí, which in turn replaced the fore-runner Maritime Inscription founded in 1940 to act as a Port Control authority during The Emergency (WWII). Originally formed at Dublin's Alexandra Basin, its headquarters was in Portobello barracks, now known as Cathal Brugha Barracks.

Organisation
Organised in five units, one each in Dublin, Waterford, Cork and Limerick, and another specialist unit, the Technical Support Unit. As of May 2018 the NSR had a strength of 115 personnel of all ranks. The reserve supplements the crew of vessels of the Irish Naval Service during patrols of territorial waters and overseas visits, as well as conducting stand-alone operations within their respective ports, such as security duties, sighting reports and intelligence gathering. All Naval Service Reserve members fall under the Naval Service Executive Division (Seaman's Division).

Enlistment is open to EU citizens between the ages of 18 and 35, provided they are ordinarily resident in Ireland, can pass fitness tests, an interview, medical examination, are of good character and obtain a security clearance, and also to non-EU citizens who have been continuously legally resident in the Republic for at least three years.

The NSR is a part-time voluntary organisation, and trains members in aspects of nautical and military disciplines to supplement and aid the permanent Naval Service. Periods of enlistment vary and is initially for four years. Progression through the ranks is possible including a commission and promotion to the rank of Lt/Cdr (see Irish Naval Service#Personnel and ranks).

Up to 6 weeks paid training may be undertaken by a reservist each year (further sea training possible when demand arises). Reservists are liable to be called up on permanent service by ministerial order in times of emergency.

NSR personnel formed part of the crew of the LÉ Eithne which was deployed to Cork as a testing centre in support of the HSE, as part of Ireland's response to the coronavirus pandemic (COVID-19) in early 2020.

Ranks

Prior to 2002 ranks for NCOs in the Naval Reserve were in blue instead of gold. Since 2002 naval reserve personnel have worn the same rank insignia as their non-reserve counterparts.

Weapons

See also
 Army Reserve (Ireland)

References

External links 
 Irish Defence Forces website - Naval Service Reserve

Irish Naval Service
Military of the Republic of Ireland
Department of Defence (Ireland)
Military units and formations established in 2005
2005 establishments in Ireland